Tangletown is a neighborhood in the Southwest community of Minneapolis. The neighborhood was officially known as Fuller until 1996 when it was changed to the present name, which reflects the winding streets in the neighborhood that do not conform to the regular street grid of South Minneapolis. The neighborhood boundaries are 46th Street to the north, Interstate 35W to the east, Diamond Lake Road to the south, and Lyndale Avenue South to the west.

The Washburn Park Water Tower is located at the highest point in the neighborhood, while Minnehaha Creek runs through the south side of the neighborhood. Washburn High School and Justice Page Middle School are located in this neighborhood.

References

External links
Minneapolis Neighborhood Profile - Tangletown
Tangletown Neighborhood Association
Nicollet East Harriet Business Association

Neighborhoods in Minneapolis